"Rack City" is a song by American rapper Tyga. First released on December 2, 2011, the song served as the third single from his second studio album, Careless World: Rise of the Last King (2012). It was produced by Mustard and Mike Free. It reached a peak of number seven on the US Billboard Hot 100 and number 53 on the Canadian Hot 100.

Background
The song originally appeared on Tyga's mixtape, Well Done 2 (2011). On November 19, 2011, Rap-Up announced that "Rack City" would be released to the iTunes Store in the United States as the second single from Careless World: Rise of the Last King.

Music video
The music video for "Rack City," directed by Chris Robinson, has been on YouTube since September 8, 2011. Tyga's former girlfriend, Blac Chyna, played the main female role. Tyga released another video for "Rack City" on January 9, 2012 with over 69 million views. The music video to the official remix of "Rack City" that features rappers Wale, Fabolous, Young Jeezy, Meek Mill and T.I. officially aired on MTV Jams as of February 24, 2012 and was directed by Alex Nazari. This video has over 30 million views on YouTube. It contains his then girlfriend, Blac Chyna, who is stripping on him.

Remixes

The official remix consists of freestyles taken from rappers who made their own remixes, Wale's verse comes from his Rack City remix which features Black Cobain. Fabolous's verse comes from his Black City remix, Young Jeezy's verse comes from his Rack City remix and Meek Mill's T.I.'s verses were arranged especially for the remix. Gucci Mane released a freestyle of the track. Rye Rye released a remix of the song as well with her female side of the rack city song. Yelawolf released a LA Lakers remix of the song. B.o.B released a video for his remix to exclusively promote his Mixtape E.P.I.C. (Every.Play.Is.Crucial) and Trae Tha Truth also released a freestyle to the track. Honey Cocaine also freestyled to the song. Tory Lanez released a freestyle to the song. Former Missy Elliott protégée Brianna Perry also freestyled off this record for her 2011 mixtape Face Off.

YouTube personality Jack Douglass wrote a parody called "Jack City" about his videos; lifecaster iJustine created a parody called "Mac City"; IFHT also created a parody called "Cat City".

Wrestler Brock Lesnar was caught insulting Roman Reigns with “Suplex City, bitch!” on a ringside microphone at Wrestlemania 31 after hitting him with a number of German suplexes during their bout. Cleveland-based hip hop artist PFV remixed this quote into a wrestling version of Rack City.

Rapper Bun B created a remix called "Crush City", dedicated to the Houston Astros 2015 postseason run.

Appearances in other media

The music video for "50 Ways To Say Goodbye" by Train contains scenes of an obsessed audience fan holding up various signs of grief support throughout the video, the final sign humorously saying "Rack City, Bitch!" 
A local United States newspaper reported on an incident in which a woman fled from police officers after she was caught applying graffiti to buildings that contained the words "Rack City Bitch." The newspaper reported that, while the woman fled, she shouted "ten ten ten twenties on ya titties bitch" to the pursuing officers. After receiving widespread media attention the woman in question later clarified that the report was a hoax, published as a joke in a satirical university publication (similar to The Onion or The Harvard Lampoon).
 Tyga has a cameo in the 2016 film Boo! A Madea Halloween, during which he performed "Rack City".
 Rihanna used elements of the synths for the song for her song "What's My Name?", on her 777 Tour.

Chart performance
For the chart dated December 10, 2011, "Rack City" debuted at number 94 on the US Billboard Hot 100. On its eighth charting week, dated January 28, 2012, the single rose 15 places to number eight - marking Tyga's first solo top 10 single. The single spent two non-consecutive weeks in the top 10 before reaching a peak of number seven on the week ending February 18, 2012. "Rack City" has also reached the top 10 on the US Hot R&B/Hip-Hop Songs chart and US Rap Songs chart - having debuted at number 91 on the former for the chart dated November 26, 2011. On August 4, 2014, the single was certified quadruple platinum by the Recording Industry Association of America (RIAA) for sales of over four million units in the United States.

On the week ending February 4, 2012, "Rack City" made its debut on the UK Singles Chart, landing in at position 158. On its third charting week, the single rose 24 places to number 98. The track also charted on the R&B chart, reaching a peak of number 27 for the week ending February 18, 2012.
It eventually peaked at number 39 in the UK and number 14 on the UK R&B chart.

Track listing

Charts

Weekly charts

Year-end charts

Certifications

Release history

References

2011 singles
2011 songs
Cash Money Records singles
Universal Republic Records singles
Young Money Entertainment singles
Tyga songs
Song recordings produced by Mustard (record producer)
Songs written by Mustard (record producer)
Songs written by Tyga
Music videos directed by Chris Robinson (director)